The Medal "In Commemoration of the 800th Anniversary of Moscow" was a state commemorative medal of the Soviet Union established by decree of the Presidium of the Supreme Soviet of the USSR on September 20, 1947 and bestowed to prominent Soviet citizens and veterans in commemoration of the 800th anniversary of the first Russian reference to Moscow, dating to 1147 when Yuri Dolgorukiy called upon the prince of the Novgorod-Severski to "come to me, brother, to Moscow".  Its statute was amended by decree of the Presidium of the Supreme Soviet of the USSR on July 17, 1980.

Medal statute 
The Medal "In Commemoration of the 800th Anniversary of Moscow" was awarded to: workers, technicians and employees of industrial enterprises, transportation and urban development of Moscow; to people working in science, technology, art, literature, education and health; to employees of state institutions, party, trade unions, Komsomol and other public organizations; who distinguished themselves in working in the reconstruction of the capital and ensured the development of its own labour in industry, transportation, urban development, and in academic and cultural institutions; to soldiers, to war or labour related invalids; to housewives who take an active part in the improvement of the city and in the work of schools and childcare facilities.  The award was conditional to having resided in the city of Moscow or its suburbs for a minimum of 5 years.

The Medal "In Commemoration of the 800th Anniversary of Moscow" was awarded on behalf of the Presidium of the Supreme Soviet of the USSR by the Executive Committee of the City of Moscow and the People's Deputies of the Regional Executive Committees based on documents issued by the heads of enterprises, the Party or government organizations.  Each medal came with an attestation of award, this attestation came in the form of a small 8 cm by 11 cm cardboard booklet bearing the award's name, the recipient's particulars and an official stamp and signature on the inside.

It was worn on the left side of the chest and in precedence of other medals or Orders of the USSR, placed immediately after the Jubilee Medal "50 Years of the Soviet Militia".  If worn in the presence of medals and Orders of the Russian Federation, the latter have precedence.

Medal description 
The Medal "In Commemoration of the 800th Anniversary of Moscow" was a 37mm in diameter circular copper medal designed by SL Tulchinsky and I I Dubasov. The rim was convex and all the inscriptions and images were in relief.  The obverse bore the helmeted left profile of Yuri Dolgorukiy.  In the lower half, along the medal circumference, the inscription "The founder of Moscow Yuri Dolgorukiy".  The reverse bore an image of the Kremlin in the center, at the bottom, the hammer and sickle with flags and arms over two laurel branches, to the left the year "1147", to the right, the year "1947".  At the top along the medal circumference, the inscription "In commemoration of the 800th anniversary of Moscow".
 
The medal was secured to a standard Russian pentagonal mount by a ring through the medal suspension loop. The mount was covered by a 24mm wide silk moiré ribbon of green, white and red.  The ribbon's coloured stripes were separated as such: white 1mm, green 11mm, white 3mm, red 1mm, white 1mm, red 1mm, white 3mm, red 2mm, white 1mm.

Recipients (partial list) 
The individuals below were recipients of the Medal "In Commemoration of the 800th Anniversary of Moscow".

 Defense Minister and Marshal of the Soviet Union Kliment Yefremovich Voroshilov
 Defense Minister and Marshal of the Soviet Union Georgy Konstantinovich Zhukov
 Rocket engineer and spacecraft designer colonel  Sergei Pavlovich Korolev
 Cellist and conductor Mstislav Leopoldovich Rostropovich
 Physicist and Nobel laureate Alexander Mikhaylovich Prokhorov
 Composer Aram Ilyich Khachaturian
 Marshal of the Soviet Union Semyon Konstantinovich Timoshenko
 Theoretical physicist, astrophysicist, Nobel laureate Vitaly Lazarevich Ginzburg
 Composer, pianist, leader of the Union of Soviet Composers Tikhon Nikolayevich Khrennikov
 Marshal of the Soviet Union Vasily Danilovich Sokolovsky
 Scientist, designer of the rocket launch complexes Vladimir Pavlovich Barmin
 Engineer Sergey Aleksandrovich Afanasyev
 Admiral of the Fleet of the Soviet Union Ivan Stepani Isakov
 Marshal of Artillery Vasily Ivanovich Kazakov
 Marshal of the Soviet Union Aleksandr Mikhaylovich Vasilevsky
 Major General Vladimir Sergeyevich Ilyushin
 Marshal of the Soviet Union Ivan Stepanovich Konev
 Marshal of the Soviet Union Leonid Aleksandrovich Govorov
 Marshal of the Soviet Union Fyodor Ivanovich Tolbukhin
 Historian Georg Vasilievich Myasnikov
 Marshal of the Soviet Union Sergey Fyodorovich Akhromeyev
 Football player and manager Konstantin Ivanovich Beskov
 Colonel General Leonid Mikhaylovich Sandalov
 Actor and People's Artist of the USSR Yevgeny Valerianovich Samoilov
 Crystallographer, geochemist and academician Nikolay Vasilyevich Belov
 Rocket designer Boris Evseyevich Chertok
 Stage and a film actor Yevgeny Yakovlevich Vesnik
 Lieutenant General Vitaly Ivanovich Popkov

See also 
Medal "In Commemoration of the 850th Anniversary of Moscow"
Orders, decorations, and medals of the Soviet Union
Battle of Moscow
City of Moscow

References 

Civil awards and decorations of the Soviet Union
History of Moscow
Awards established in 1947
1947 establishments in the Soviet Union